Song Jung-Hyun (born 28 May 1976) is a South Korean footballer.

He was arrested on the charge connected with the match fixing allegations on 7 July 2011.

Club career statistics

References

External links

1976 births
Living people
Association football midfielders
South Korean footballers
South Korea international footballers
Jeonnam Dragons players
Daegu FC players
Ulsan Hyundai FC players
K League 1 players
Sportspeople from Daegu
Ajou University alumni